Fanni Illés (born 1 May 1992) is a Hungarian Paralympic swimmer. She was born without legs and has webbed hands. She has been a part of the Hungarian national swimming team since 2006, aged 14, and has participated at three Summer Paralympic Games. She competed at the 2020 Summer Paralympics, winning a gold medal.

Life 
Illés was advised by doctors to do swimming after her diagnosis of scoliosis aged 12. She started swimming training lessons in the nearby town of Hévíz. She was nominated for Hungarian Disabled Sportswoman of the Year in 2019. She competed at the 2019 World Para Swimming Championships, winning a gold medal.

References

1992 births
Living people
Sportspeople from Keszthely
Swimmers from Budapest
Paralympic swimmers of Hungary
Hungarian female breaststroke swimmers
Swimmers at the 2008 Summer Paralympics
Swimmers at the 2012 Summer Paralympics
Swimmers at the 2016 Summer Paralympics
Swimmers at the 2020 Summer Paralympics
Medalists at the 2020 Summer Paralympics
Paralympic gold medalists for Hungary
Paralympic medalists in swimming
S6-classified Paralympic swimmers
Medalists at the World Para Swimming Championships
Medalists at the World Para Swimming European Championships
20th-century Hungarian women
21st-century Hungarian women